Robert E. Payne (born 1941) is an American attorney and jurist serving as a senior United States district judge of the United States District Court for the Eastern District of Virginia.

Early life and education

Born in Mount Sterling, Kentucky, Payne received a Bachelor of Arts degree from Washington and Lee University in 1963 and a Juris Doctor from Washington and Lee University School of Law in 1967.

Career 
While serving in the United States Army, Payne was a member of the Judge Advocate General's Corps from 1967 to 1971. He operated a private practice in Richmond, Virginia from 1971 to 1992.

Federal judicial service

On November 20, 1991, Payne was nominated by President George H. W. Bush to a seat on the United States District Court for the Eastern District of Virginia vacated by Joseph Calvitt Clarke Jr. Payne was confirmed by the United States Senate on May 12, 1992, and received his commission on May 13, 1992. He assumed senior status on May 7, 2007.

References

Sources

1941 births
Living people
Judges of the United States District Court for the Eastern District of Virginia
United States district court judges appointed by George H. W. Bush
20th-century American judges
Washington and Lee University School of Law alumni
Washington and Lee University alumni
People from Mount Sterling, Kentucky
21st-century American judges
McGuireWoods people